Setare-ye Sorkh was an Iranian Maoist periodical publication that was published in Rome, Italy, in the early 1970s. It served as the official mouthpiece of the Revolutionary Organization of the Tudeh Party. The publication was headquartered in Rome, Italy.

The publication advocated the line that third-world countries were semi-feudal and semi-colonial, and recommended peasant revolution in the absence of an urban proletariat.

References

1970 establishments in Italy
1979 disestablishments in Italy
Defunct political magazines published in Italy
Communist magazines
Magazines established in 1970
Magazines disestablished in 1979
Magazines published in Rome
Persian-language magazines
Maoism in Europe
Maoism in Iran